Bonghwa station is a railway station on the Yeongdong Line. It is located at Bonghwa, North Gyeongsang

External links
 Station information from Korail

Railway stations in North Gyeongsang Province
Bonghwa County
Railway stations opened in 1950
1950 establishments in South Korea
20th-century architecture in South Korea